General Powell frequently refers to Colin Powell (1937–2021), a US Army four-star general and US Secretary of State. It may also refer to:

Henry Watson Powell (1733–1814), British Army general
Herbert B. Powell (1903–1998), US Army general
Kenneth R. Powell (1915–1987), US Air Force major general
Roger Powell (general) (born 1949), Australian Army major general
William G. Powell (1871–1955), U.S. Marine Corps major general
William Henry Powell (soldier) (1825–1904), Union brigadier general in the American Civil War

See also

 Donald Powell (1896–1942), who served in the British India Army and was awarded the D.S.O., achieving a final rank of Brigadier (British non-general field rank)
 Robert Baden-Powell, 1st Baron Baden-Powell (1857–1941), British Army Lieutenant General who founded the Scouting Movement
 Powell (disambiguation)
 General (disambiguation)